Desertification is defined as “the rapid depletion of plant life and the loss of topsoil at desert boundaries and in semiarid regions, usually caused by a combination of drought and the overexploitation of grasses and other vegetation by people.” There is a common misconception that desertification spreads from a desert core. The truth is that land degradation can occur far away from deserts, and the presence of a desert has no effect on desertification. Another misconception is that droughts cause desertification. This is only true if the land had been abused before the drought occurred, and continued to be exploited during the dry season. If the land is well managed however, the land will recover from a drought once it rains again.

Causes

One of the main causes of desertification is poor soil conservation, which leads to soil degradation. Healthy soil contains organic matter, which is formed when decaying materials are transformed into soil that contains nutrients such as carbon, nitrogen, phosphorus, and sulfur.
Unstable farming methods are also a cause of desertification. Overuse of fertilizers, lack of crop rotation, and poor irrigation practices strip the soil of its nutrients. When the topsoil is depleted of its organic matter, it either becomes too loose or too compacted, which can lead to erosion.
Overgrazing is a large problem and another cause of desertification. Grasses are important in anchoring topsoil in a dryland region. When animals are allowed to graze too much on already dry land, they expose the soil to destructive forces such as thunderstorms and wind.

Affected areas

According to The World Bank, Lebanon had 13.85% of arable land in the country. That was the highest it has been since 2000, and the number is getting smaller. The most recent number, from 2010, is 11.14%. The percentage of permanent cropland in Lebanon also went down from 13.69% to 12.32% between 2009 and 2010. According to a study done by the National Work to Fight Desertification program, over 60 percent of Lebanon's land is at risk of desertification. Lebanon's land desertification spreads 60 kilometers and begins at the edge of the city Baalbek and ends at the border of Syria. Most studies on desertification in Lebanon have concluded that the area of northern Bekaa is the region most affected by this environmental issue. One of Lebanon's main causes of desertification is development of cities on prime agricultural land. Forests were cleared and roads were built without any consideration of the impact it would have on the society and environment, which led to severe land degradation. Additionally, this area has suffered from a severe lack of rainfall. Although there have been ecotourism projects in Hermel which help raise awareness of the environment for the residents, most of the land has become unusable and projects to repair the land would leave a large bill for landowners.

Agriculture

Desertification reduces natural food production, which makes the country turn to foreign imports of food. This foreign aid can lead to a lack of agriculture in the country, which makes it more costly to produce locally. Lebanon's agriculture is considered essential to the economy. Agriculture in Lebanon is a source of food as well as exports including fruits, vegetables, eggs, cereals, sugar, and livestock products. According to the Food and Agriculture Organization of the United Nations, there was $280 million worth of financial consequences to the agricultural sector. This included crop production, fisheries, forestry, and livestock. Major problems facing agricultural production cause the rural people in Lebanon to live in poverty. These problems include the small size of agricultural holdings, lack of agriculture policies, high production costs, and lack of specialized agricultural credit. The agriculture sector in Lebanon accounts for 5% of the country’s GDP and employs about 8% of the labor force. About 70% of Lebanon’s food needs are satisfied by imports. Lebanon’s agriculture sector is underdeveloped and poorly managed, and only 55% of the productive areas are used, often inefficiently and wastefully. The agriculture sector also suffers from a lack of funding and receives less than 1% of the country’s budget. The total food imports for 2009 were estimated at US$2.216 billion, or 13% of the country’s total imports. The top 10 food imports into Lebanon are as follows:

Economic impact

Poverty
With the growth of desertification in Lebanon comes the growth of poverty. Desertification is a large threat to economic activity in Lebanon, and about 35 percent of families in Lebanon live below the poverty line. Because of this, many families have moved from the country to the city. Most of these people are small farmers, wage laborers, fishers, livestock herders, and women who are heads of households. In 2006 poverty was the highest in North Lebanon (52.5%), then South Lebanon (42%), Bekaa (29%), Mount Lebanon (19.5%), and Nabatiyeh (19%). The North has 21% of Lebanon's population, but 46% of the extremely poor and 38% of the entire poor population. In Bekaa, Lebanon's region most affected by desertification, the local inhabitants average $50 a month.

Unemployment
Since Lebanon's civil war, the country has been facing a severe economic problem because of the destruction of Lebanese industries and infrastructure. The agriculture sector is also weak because most of the rural Lebanese citizens migrated to the city. Millions of foreign workers travel to Lebanon every year and offer their services at a lower price to compete with the Lebanese workers. The labor supply exceeds the demand because of this, causing higher unemployment rates. The Lebanese also find some jobs, such as agriculture, unattractive because of the poor wages.

Combating desertification
The United Nations is working on combating desertification in Lebanon. They have set up Green Houses cooperatives Nurseries to increase farmer productivity in the country. According to the UNDP, The Cooperative association is trying to increase the interaction between different communities and develop a common source of livelihood between them that benefits farmers. Farmers can bring their seeds to the greenhouse where they are treated and grown in a healthy environment. When the farmers get their seeds back, the results are of very high quality, and these farmers can then sell these crops for a better price and increase production. This increase in production leads to an increase in income and employment which helps to improve Lebanon's economy.

To help raise awareness about the dangers of desertification as well as present their local project, Lebanon's Agricultural Ministry and its Combat Desertification Project unit, in collaboration with the UNDP, organized a trip to both villages in the North East Bekaa. Since March 2004 the CDP has been running their first agro-tourism pilot project in the Deir al-Ahmar-Yammouneh area. The agro-tourism project has tro objectives: generating additional income for the local communities and conserving the environment. It was established in cooperation with the hiking organization Esprit-Monade and the Women's association of Deir al-Ahmar Agro-tourism farms in Lebanon offer tours to allow a person to view the growing, harvesting, and processing of Lebanon's locally grown foods. Farmers will often provide a home-stay opportunity along with lessons in farming.

Notes

Desertification
Environment of Lebanon